Wymering is a residential area of the city of Portsmouth in the English county of Hampshire. Unlike the majority of Portsmouth, it is located on the mainland rather than Portsea Island.

Wymering was one of the estates held by Hampshire's biggest landowner Edward the Confessor immediately before the Norman conquest.

Wymering is mentioned in the Domesday Book and was a small village in rural area until it was incorporated into Portsmouth in 1920. On incorporation into Portsmouth a 300-house council housing estate was built there, being completed by 1929.

In addition to the mediaeval church, one building that did remain is Wymering Manor. The manor is the oldest building in Portsmouth. It has been a Youth Hostel in its past but is now unoccupied and is reputed to be haunted.

References 

Areas of Portsmouth